Pelecocera tricincta is a species of hoverfly, from the family Syrphidae.

Description
It has a black scutellum, three black bands on the yellow abdomen and swollen triangular third antennal segments.

Adults can be found from June to October, when they visit yellow composites such as Hieracium, flowers of Common Tormentil (Potentilla erecta), heather (Calluna) and Cross-leaved heath (Erica tetralix).

Distribution
This species is present in most of Europe, in the eastern Palearctic realm, and in North Africa.

Habitat
This species is usually associated with the margins of bogs, wet heaths, mires and heathlands.

References

 Biolib
 Fauna Europaea

External links
 Syrphidae.com

Diptera of Europe
Eristalinae
Insects described in 1822
Taxa named by Johann Wilhelm Meigen